Udo Querch (born 16 June 1941) is an Austrian weightlifter. He competed in the men's heavyweight event at the 1964 Summer Olympics.

References

1941 births
Living people
Austrian male weightlifters
Olympic weightlifters of Austria
Weightlifters at the 1964 Summer Olympics
Place of birth missing (living people)
20th-century Austrian people